Robert Smrekar is a male former international table tennis player from Slovenia.

He won a silver medal at the 1991 World Table Tennis Championships in the Swaythling Cup (men's team event) with Zoran Kalinić, Ilija Lupulesku and Zoran Primorac for Yugoslavia.

See also
 List of table tennis players
 List of World Table Tennis Championships medalists

References

Yugoslav table tennis players
Slovenian male table tennis players
Living people
World Table Tennis Championships medalists
Year of birth missing (living people)